The Grand Alliance is big-tent political alliance of predominantly left-leaning political parties in Bangladesh formed before the 2008 general election. The Grand Alliance  is led by the Awami League.

Membership

Electoral history

2008 Bangladeshi general election 
Total seats: 300

Grand Alliance: 263

Four Party Alliance : 33

Independents and others : 04

2014 Bangladeshi general election 
Total seats: 300

Grand Alliance: 280

Four Party Alliance: Boycotted

Independents and others : 20

2018 Bangladeshi general election 
Total seats: 300

Grand Alliance: 289

Jatiya Oikya Front: 8

Independents and others : 3

References

2008 establishments in Bangladesh
Bangladesh Awami League
Political parties established in 2008
Political party alliances in Bangladesh
Politics of Bangladesh
Popular fronts
Socialist parties in Bangladesh